William Adolph Baillie Grohman (April 1 1851–February 11 1921) was an Anglo-Austrian author  of works on the Tyrol and the history of hunting, a big game sportsman, and a pioneer in the Kootenay region of British Columbia.

Biography
Grohmann was born in 1851 in Gmunden, the eldest son of Adolf Rheinhold Grohmann (1822–1877) and Francis Margaret 'Fanny' Reade (1831–1908).  He spent much of his youth in Tyrol in Austria, and could speak Tyrolese dialect like a native. His early years were spent at the Schloss von St. Wolfgang in the Salzkammergut, which had a famous garden. His father was a manic depressive and in 1861 had to be committed to an asylum. In 1873 his mother bought the semi-derelict Schloss Matzen  in the Tyrol, near the branch of the Zillertal and the Inn Valley. He was educated by private tutors and at Elizabeth College, Guernsey. As a young man Grohmann roamed out from the family castle to hunt chamois and deer in the surrounding high alps, wandering for days through the still-remote Tyrolese mountain villages. His two earliest books, Tyrol & the Tyrolese (1876)  and Gaddings with a Primitive People (1878) , provide a rare first-hand insight into Tyrolese folk customs and the austere, isolated existence of pre-industrial Alpine village communities.

He was an expert mountaineer and made the first winter ascent  of the Großglockner, the highest mountain in Austria (3798m), on 2 January 1875, and was a member of the Alpine Club. He is credited as being one of the first to introduce skis to the Tyrol, having been sent four pairs by his father in law, the railway magnate Tom Nickalls, who had a hunting lodge in Norway - he started using them in 1893, as is related in an article in  The Field in 1937, by his daughter Olga, who herself became an early member of the Innsbruck Ski club. The article in The Field  includes photographs of WABG's wife Florence on skis in 1894 - the earliest known photograph of a woman on skis in the alps. Skis were also introduced to the Tyrol the same year at Kitzbuhl by  Franz Reisch.

A crack shot and a passionate big-game hunter, he travelled out to the American West many times the 1870s and 1880s to shoot big game when the Rockies and mountain states were opening up to sportsmen. His book Camps in the Rockies (1882)  gives an account of his travels through Wyoming and Idaho, both as a "topshelfer" (a rich comfort-laden sportsman ) and later on – more to his boyhood taste of stalking with Tyrolean mountain huntsmen – roughing it with trappers and Native Americans. Although written in a style of detached amusement to entertain armchair Victorian readers, this work, like his earlier books about the Tyrolese, has careful and sympathetic passages on American Indian and local customs, and gives a valuable first-hand account of the American and Canadian West just before and after the arrival of the railway. He ranged widely over the Pacific Slope and the Central Rockies and explored unclimbed peaks in the Selkirks.

He wrote a number of articles for British magazines promoting the possibilities of British Columbia. In his youth he had seen how the embankment of the Inn River in the lower Inntal had turned unproductive flood land into profitable farmland and so envisaged that a similar control of the Kootenay River and a lowering of the water levels of the Kootenay Lake would create large areas of fertile farmland. This plan was thwarted by political pressure from the Canadian Pacific Railway and others, who managed ultimately to get the concession revoked and awarded to rival interests. Probably his impatient and untactful temperament and privileged background was not well suited to the political manoeuvring needed to mollify the Provincial Colonial Administration and counter the machinations of the CPR and other interests. Before the concession was revoked the Kootenay Company was held to one of the conditions of its grant – that it must build a canal to connect the Columbia River and Kootenay and William Adolph Baillie-Grohman. The canal, took a massive investment and because of the railway, was pointless (only two ships ever used it)  and the project failed. It is now a historic site at Canal Flats, British Columbia. Grohmann lived some time in Victoria, British Columbia, negotiating the concession with the government of BC, and then in the Kootenay, opening the first steam sawmill in the region and the first steam boat on lake Kootenay; he was the first J.P and the first postmaster in Kootenay . His account of his time in BC Fifteen Years' Sport and Life in the Hunting Grounds of Western America and British Columbia (1900)  describes his time pioneering, and also has accounts of hunting the rare white Rocky mountain "antelope goat", sometimes known then as "Haplocerus Montanus" but now assigned the Linnaean name of Oreamnos americanus, as well as the pursuit of  many other types of game. Baillie Grohmans's scheme for reclamation was later successfully implement by others .

His later books include successful works on the history of the Tyrol (by then an increasingly popular destination for English tourists); Tyrol, The Land in the Mountains (1907)  and Tyrol (1908) as well as a guidebook to his own castle in German Schloß Matzen im Unterinntal (1908).

A passionate collector, he amassed a large collection of antique European furniture and of European sporting art (his collection of sporting prints was sold at a special sale at Sotheby's in 1923), and in his later years he developed an erudite interest in the history and art of sport, building  up an extensive library on hunting and game animals, including early ecological studies along with early treatises on hunting in many different European languages.  Assisted by his wife, Florence, he produced a lavishly illustrated and authoritative edition of The Master of Game (1904), the second oldest English book on hunting, a translation (from the French Livre de Chasse 1387 of Gaston Phébus) by Edward of Norwich, 2nd Duke of York. This has a foreword by his friend and later US president Teddy Roosevelt, also an avid big game hunter, who visited him in the Tyrol. In his book on early depictions of hunting Sport in art, An iconography of sport (1913),  Baillie Grohman was able to bring together  a lifetime's   understanding of hunting in the field with an extensive  historical knowledge of early sporting art gained through his own collecting and research. An edition of Maximillian I of Austria's Das Jagdbuch Kaiser Maximillians I (1901) with Dr Mayr  is also of interest for early game ecology.

As well as writing authoring 11 books, he published numerous articles in contemporary British magazines on both historical and travel subjects.

On the outbreak of the First World war, as  British Nationals, he and his wife faced internment but were allowed to leave Austria after the intercession of Prince Auersperg. They returned after the war and started the Tyrolean Relief Fund  to help Tyroleans through the  famine  that was an aftermath of the war in the Tyrol.  He died in 1921 in Schloss Matzen.

Family

In 1885 Baillie Grohman married Florence née Nickalls, daughter of Tom Nickalls (1828−1899) and Emily née Quihampton (1834-1909), Tom was a London stockbroker known as the "Erie King" from his many coups in American railway shares, the champion rowers Guy Nickalls and Vivian Nickalls were Florence's brothers.

Florence and William had a son and a daughter: their son, Vice-Admiral Harold Tom Baillie Grohman RN CB, DSO, OBE (1887–1978), had a distinguished career in the Royal Navy, commanding the battleship HMS Ramillies at the start of the Second World War; and their daughter, Olga Florence Baillie Grohman (1889–1947), who married secondly Oscar Ferris Watkins, became a pioneer in Kenya and the first female Member of the Kenya Legislative Council (MLC).

Bibliography

Books Authored by W A Baillie Grohman

Articles by W A Baillie Grohman

See also
Grohman Narrows Provincial Park British Columbia
Schloss Matzen Tyrol
Elizabeth Watkins (writer)

References

Legacy
Mount Grohman (2299 m) near Nelson, British Columbia is named after him as are the Grohman Narrows of Grohman Narrows Provincial Park.

External links
Mount Grohman
Grossglockner
 Baillie Grohman Winery 
 Schloss Matzen, Austria
 
 

English non-fiction writers
Austrian male writers
English hunters
1851 births
1921 deaths
Nickalls family
English male non-fiction writers